Sidman is an unincorporated community and census-designated place in Cambria County, Pennsylvania, United States. Its ZIP code is 15955. It was part of the St. Michael-Sidman census-designated place, before it was split into two separate CDPs during the 2010 census. The population of Sidman as of the 2010 census was 431.

References

Census-designated places in Pennsylvania
Census-designated places in Cambria County, Pennsylvania